Cristiano Rojas is a Wichí Anglican Suffragan Bishop in Northern Argentina.

References

Living people
Anglican bishops of Northern Argentina
21st-century Anglican bishops in South America
Year of birth missing (living people)
Argentine people of indigenous peoples descent
Argentine Anglicans